Obthorpe is a hamlet in the civil parish of Thurlby, in the South Kesteven district of Lincolnshire, England. Thurlby is the nearest village,  to the north.

The house known as Obthorpe Lodge lies about 1 mile due east from the hamlet; both are on the Macmillan Way footpath.

Obthorpe is mentioned in the Domesday account as "Opetorp". Lordship in 1066 was held by Ulf Fenman, transferred to Gilbert of Ghent in 1086, who was also Tenant-in-chief.

References

External links

Hamlets in Lincolnshire
South Kesteven District